{{DISPLAYTITLE:C9H13NO3}}
The molecular formula C9H13NO3 (molar mass: 183.20 g/mol, exact mass: 183.089543) may refer to:
 Adrenaline, also known as ephinephrine
 Ginkgotoxin
 Nordefrin (Corbadrine, Levonordefrin), a catecholamine
 Normetanephrine
 2,4,5-Trihydroxyamphetamine